Free Dirt (Live) is a live double-CD album by American experimental rock and jazz band Skeleton Crew. It is their first live album and was released posthumously in December 2021 by Austrian record label, Klanggalerie. It comprises live material by the group recorded at eight venues in Europe, Canada and the United States between 1982 and 1986. Both CDs feature Fred Frith and Tom Cora, with Dave Newhouse on eight tracks on the first CD, and Zeena Parkins on thirteen tracks on the second CD.

Background
When compiling Free Dirt, Frith's intention was to recreate the atmosphere of a Skeleton Crew concert. He wanted to convey the spontaneous nature of their performances, when planning was often left to the last minute and things did not always go according to plan. Frith assembled the album from mostly 35+-year-old cassette tape recordings of varying quality from concerts around the world. He edited and "sonically enhanced" the recordings to create an almost seamless stream of music. Frith stated in the album's liner notes:

"Listening to our sorta kinda demented anti-industry and even anti-music angle of view, I'm still delighted at how loose we were with the material, how the same pieces changed so radically from night to night ... I re-discovered pieces that I'd completely forgotten about – can't even remember the titles – and listening to the tapes took on the feeling of being there on that breathless runaway train ... I hope I managed to get that across."

Reception
A review of Free Dirt (Live) at Vital Weekly described the album as "a two-hour wild ride of music". It said it is full of diverse styles, ranging from rock music to folk tunes to "pikey punkiness", plus plenty of enthusiastic improvisation. The inclusion of prerecorded voices adds "a dramatic radio quality to the music." The reviewer enjoyed the way it "bounc[ed] around the place" and found the album "fascinat[ing]". In a review of the album at salt peanuts*, Eyal Hareuveni called Free Dirt (Live) "a work of love for an era and for music-making that is almost impossible today". Hareuveni said "it captures beautifully the amazing creative spirit and post-punk energy" that Skeleton Crew possessed, and "radiat[es] an uplifting power", while emphasizing just how well Frith, Cora, Newhouse and Parkins connected. Rick Anderson wrote at CD Hotlist that melodies on Free Dirt often degenerate into "scratches and caterwauls", while improvised noise sometimes morphs into folk tunes. Anderson said: "One of the wonderful things about Fred Frith is that even when he's making horrible noise, he does it with such obvious delight and with such a well-communicated sense of warmth and invitation that you find yourself just going with it and having a wonderful time."

Reviewing Free Dirt in the Italian magazine , Alessandro Di Tizio said this album is an important chronicle of Skeleton Crew's music. The two studio albums they released are mere snapshots of their work, whereas Free Dirt shows how their music evolved from the beginning, how songs materialized from improvisation, and how songs changed shape with each performance. Di Tizio explained that this album demonstrates how they used improvisation to explore new ideas, and reveals the group's creative and compositional process. He stated that despite the varying quality of the tapes used to create the album, it flows smoothly, giving the impression that it is a recording of a single performance. Di Tizio called their composed material "always beautiful, complex and highly creative" (brani sempre belli, complessi e altamente creativi), and added that the new songs on the second CD give a glimpse of the direction Skeleton Crew may have taken had they not disbanded in early 1986.

Track listing
All tracks composed by Skeleton Crew, unless otherwise stated. All tracks performed by Fred Frith and Tom Cora, plus Dave Newhouse or Zeena Parkins where noted.

Source: Liner notes

Track notes
CD 1
Tracks 4 and 9 were recorded at the Musik Ausser Kontrol Festival, Rote Fabrik, Zürich, Switzerland on October 9, 1982
Tracks 13, 14 and 17 were recorded at 28 Rue Dunois, Paris on October 22, 1982
Tracks 7, 15 and 16 were recorded at Würzburg, Germany on October 30, 1982
Tracks 1, 5, 6, 8, 10–12 and 18 were recorded at Salle Rameau, Lyon, France on May 23, 1983
Tracks 2 and 3 were recorded at Hall Gatty, Saint-Étienne, France on May 24, 1983

CD 2
Tracks 6–8, 10, 15 and 16 were recorded at Triton Uptown, Champaign, Illinois on November 15, 1984
Tracks 3, 4, 12 and 18 were recorded at The lsabella, Toronto on July 14/15, 1985
Tracks 1, 2, 5, 9, 11, 13, 14, 17 and 19 were recorded by David Bryant at CBGB, New York City on September 13, 1986
Source: Liner notes

Personnel
CD 1
Fred Frith – guitar, 6-string bass guitar, violin, slap-thwacker, Casio, cassette player, snare drum, bass drum, voice
Tom Cora – cello, bass guitar, samples, bass drum, woodblocks, hi-hat, cymbal, voice
Dave Newhouse (tracks 4, 7, 9, 13–17) – bass clarinet, alto saxophone, keyboards, miscellaneous percussion

CD 2
Fred Frith – guitar, bass guitar, violin, snare drum, bass drum, voice
Tom Cora – cello, bass guitar, accordion, bass drum, woodblocks, hi-hat, cymbal, voice
Zeena Parkins (tracks 1–5, 9, 11–14, 17–19) – electric harp, keyboards, accordion, toms, voice
	
Sound and production
Compiled, edited and sonically enhanced from mostly 35+-year-old cassette tapes by Fred Frith
Mastered by Myles Boisen at Headless Buddha, Oakland, California in August 2021
Layout by Lisa Robotka
Liner notes by Fred Frith
Source: Liner notes

Notes

References

External links
Free Dirt (Live) at Klanggalerie

2021 live albums
Live experimental music albums
Albums produced by Fred Frith